Mathurin Jacques Brisson (30 April 1723 – 23 June 1806) was a French zoologist and natural philosopher.

Brisson was born at Fontenay-le-Comte. The earlier part of his life was spent in the pursuit of natural history; his published works in this field included Le Règne animal (1756)  and the highly regarded Ornithologie (1760).

As a young man, he was a disciple and assistant of René Antoine Ferchault de Réaumur. For a period of time he was an instructor of physical sciences and natural history to the family of the monarch. He held the chair of physics at the College of Navarre, and from 1759 was a member of the Academy of Sciences.

A significant work involving the "specific weight of bodies" was his Pesanteur Spécifique des Corps (1787). In his investigations of electricity, Brisson was opposed to the theories of Priestley and Franklin.

He died at Croissy-sur-Seine near Paris.

Publications
 
 Ornithologia, sive Synopsis methodica sistens avium divisionem in ordines, sectiones, genera, species, ipsarumque varietates. Bauche, Paris, Leiden 1760–63, with engraved illustrations by François-Nicolas Martinet.
 Supplementum Ornithologiæ sive Citationes, descriptionesque antea omissæ & species de novo adjectæ, ad suaquaque genera redactæ. Paris 1760.
 Lettres de deux Espagnols sur les manufactures. Vergera 1769.
 Dictionnaire raisonné de physique. Thou, Paris 1781–1800.
 Observations sur les nouvelles découvertes aërostatiques. Lamy, Paris 1784.
 Pesanteur spécifique des corps. Paris 1787.
 Traité élémentaire ou Principes de physique. Moutard & Bossange, Paris 1789–1803.
 Trattato elementare ovvero Principi di fisica. Grazioli, Florenz 1791.
 Die spezifischen Gewichte der Körper. Leipzig 1795.
 Suplemento al Diccionario universal de física. Cano, Madrid 1796–1802.
 Principes élémentaires de l'histoire naturelle et chymique des substances minérales. Paris 1797.
 Anfangsgründe der Naturgeschichte und Chemie der Mineralien. Mainz 1799.
 Instruction sur les nouveaux poids et mesures. Paris 1799.
 Elémens ou Principes physico-chymiques. Bossange, Paris 1800.
 Elements of the natural history and chymical analysis of mineral substances. Ritchie, Walker, Vernor & Hood, London 1800.
 Tratado elemental ó principios de física. Madrid 1803/04.

Sources

External links
 
Gallica has a free digital download of  Brisson, Mathurin-Jacques Ornithologia sive Synopsis methodica sistens avium divisionem in ordines, sectiones, genera, species, ipsarumque varietates Leiden (1760–1763) in Microforme The French word for Search is Recherche.
Dictionnaire raisonné de physique, 2nd éd, Planches – Linda Hall Library

1723 births
1806 deaths
Natural philosophers
French ornithologists
French entomologists
French zoologists
Members of the French Academy of Sciences
People from Fontenay-le-Comte
18th-century French writers
18th-century French male writers
19th-century French writers
18th-century philosophers
19th-century philosophers
French male non-fiction writers
19th-century French male writers